George Carter (January 10, 1944 – November 18, 2020) was an American professional basketball player. He was a 6'4" swingman.

High school career
Carter played at Silver Creek High School in New York, graduating in 1963. He was a two-time all-Western New York selection in basketball. He also played high school football and ran track.

College career
Carter played collegiate basketball at St. Bonaventure University.

Professional career
Carter was selected by the Detroit Pistons in the eighth round of the 1967 NBA draft. Carter, Dave Winfield and Mickey McCarty are the only three people known to have been drafted by 4 different professional leagues in one year. He was also selected by the New Orleans Buccaneers in the 1967 ABA Draft. He was also drafted by the MLB's New York Mets and the NFL's Buffalo Bills.

Carter played only game for the Pistons and then joined the Washington Caps of the rival American Basketball Association. He went on to play seven seasons in the ABA, spending time with eight teams: the Caps, the Virginia Squires, the Carolina Cougars, the Pittsburgh Condors, the New York Nets, the Memphis Sounds, the Baltimore Claws (preseason games only) and the Utah Stars.  Carter represented the Squires in the 1971 ABA All-Star Game. He scored 8,863 combined ABA/NBA career points.

Death
Carter died on November 18, 2020 in Las Vegas.

References

External links

1944 births
2020 deaths
Amateur Athletic Union men's basketball players
American men's basketball players
Basketball players from Buffalo, New York
Carolina Cougars players
Detroit Pistons draft picks
Detroit Pistons players
Memphis Sounds players
New Orleans Buccaneers draft picks
New York Nets players
Pittsburgh Condors players
Shooting guards
Small forwards
St. Bonaventure Bonnies men's basketball players
Utah Stars players
Virginia Squires players
Washington Caps players